WORZ may refer to:

 Werribee Open Range Zoo
 WORZ-LP, a defunct low-power radio station (107.9 FM) formerly licensed to Key Largo, Florida, United States